The  (abbreviation: FDG) is a sixth form Gymnasium in the district Höchst of Frankfurt am Main, Germany.

The eponym is Friedrich Dessauer (1881–1963). The school has approximately 101 (year 2004) teachers and 853 (year 2009) students.

Famous persons connected to the school are Michael Gahler (born 1960), a German politician and Member of the European Parliament for Hesse.

In 2007 the old building was torn down and rebuilt in 2009.

References

External links 

  

Gymnasiums in Germany
Sixth form colleges
Schools in Frankfurt
Educational institutions established in 1975
1975 establishments in West Germany